Jade Dusablon (born January 15, 1994) is a Canadian long-distance swimmer from Quebec City, Quebec. Dusablon won a gold medal in the women's open water 5 km swim at the Fran Crippen Cup. She finished 4th at the 2014 Pan Pacific Swimming Championships. She won a silver medal in the 10 km event at the 2011 FINA World Cup  in Lac Mégantic and added a 10 km silver in 2013 at the World Cup in Lac St-Jean.

In April 2017, Dusablon was named to Canada's 2017 World Aquatics Championships team in Budapest, Hungary.

References

External links
 
 
 

1994 births
Living people
Canadian female long-distance swimmers
Pan American Games competitors for Canada
Swimmers at the 2015 Pan American Games
Swimmers from Quebec City
20th-century Canadian women
21st-century Canadian women